Brookhay railway station served the settlement of Brookhay, Staffordshire, England in 1849 on the Dudley to Lichfield line.

History 
The station was opened in June 1849 by the South Staffordshire Railway. It was a very short-lived station, disappearing from Bradshaw six months later in December 1849.

References 

Disused railway stations in Staffordshire
Railway stations in Great Britain opened in 1849
Railway stations in Great Britain closed in 1849
1849 establishments in England
1849 disestablishments in England